Cinaethon of Sparta ( Kinaithon ho Lakedaimonios) was a legendary Greek poet to whom different sources ascribe the lost epics Oedipodea, Little Iliad and Telegony. Eusebius says that he flourished in 764–3 BC.

Select editions and translations

Critical editions
 .
 .
 .
 .

Translations
 . (The link is to the 1st edition of 1914.) English translation with facing Greek text; now obsolete except for its translations of the ancient quotations.
 . Greek text with facing English translation

Notes

References
 .

Ancient Spartan poets
Early Greek epic poets
8th-century BC Spartans
8th-century BC poets
Year of birth unknown
Year of death unknown